My Sin is a 1931 American pre-Code drama film directed by George Abbott, and written by Abbott, Owen Davis, Adelaide Heilbron. It was adapted from the play, Her Past, written by Frederick J. Jackson. The film stars Tallulah Bankhead, Fredric March, Harry Davenport, Scott Kolk, and Lily Cahill. The film was released on October 3, 1931, by Paramount Pictures.

Plot
In Panama, infamous nightclub hostess Carlotta (Tallulah Bankhead) kills, in a struggle, a man in self-defence and is put on trial for murder. Her defence counsel is Dick Grady (Fredric March), a lawyer who has become an alcoholic. When he proves Carlotta's innocence, however, Dick regains respect and new employment through Roger Metcalf (Harry Davenport). He also manages to save Carlotta from committing suicide. He lends her money, and they both dream up a new identity for her as "Ann Trevor," and she moves to New York. Through various letters and repayment checks, Dick learns that "Ann Trevor" is happy and successful and he soon realizes he is in love with her. 
In the meantime Ann is successfully working in New York as interior decorator, sharing an apartment with her boss,  Helen Grace (Lily Cahill). One customer, Larry Gordon (Scott Kolk), is so enthusiastic about Ann's work, that he falls in love with her. When Roger Metcalf comes to a dinner with Larry, his mother and Ann, Roger recognizes her and calls Dick to come along. Ann is somehow forced to tell Larry the truth about her past. And after that the relationship breaks apart.
Finally Dick moves to New York, buys the cottage Larry had bought for her, and calls in the shop to send him Ann Trevor for remodeling. They confess their love for each other, and they walk together through the entrance of the cottage.

Cast
Tallulah Bankhead as Carlotta / Ann Trevor
Fredric March as Dick Grady
Harry Davenport as Roger Metcalf
Scott Kolk as Lawrence "Larry" Gordon
Anne Sutherland as Mrs. Gordon
Margaret Adams as Paula Marsden
Lily Cahill as Helen Grace
Joseph Calleia as Juan

Production
Filming of My Sin began June 15, 1931, at Paramount-Publix New York Studios in Astoria, Long Island.

See also
The House That Shadows Built (1931) Paramount promotional film with excerpts of My Sin

References

External links
 

1931 films
1931 drama films
American drama films
American black-and-white films
Films set in Panama
Films set in New York (state)
Films directed by George Abbott
Paramount Pictures films
1930s English-language films
1930s American films